The Twelfth Seimas of Lithuania is a parliament (Seimas) in Lithuania. Elections took place on 9 October 2016, with the run-off on 23 October. The Seimas commenced its work on 14 November 2016 and served a four-year term, with the last session taking place on 10 November 2020.

In this term two members-elect were born after 11 March 1990 (Rūta Miliūtė and Virginijus Sinkevičius).

Elections

In the elections in 2016, 70 members of the parliament were elected on proportional party lists and 71 in single-member constituencies. Elections took place on 9 October 2012. Run-off elections were held on 23 October in the single-seat constituencies where no candidate secured a seat in the first round.

Activities
Viktoras Pranckietis was elected as a Speaker.

Since 2018 the Lithuanian Farmers and Greens Union tried to obstruct a work of critical of them institutions (notably LRT and Constitutional Court of Lithuania).

Composition

Parliamentary groups

After the elections, the parliamentary groups were formed in the Seimas, largely on the party lines: Lithuanian Farmers and Greens Union (LVŽSF), Social Democratic Party of Lithuania (LSDPF), Liberal Movement (LSF), Order and Justice (FTT), Electoral Action of the Poles in Lithuania (LLRAF), Homeland Union - Lithuanian Christian Democrats (TSLKDF) and the Mixed Group of Members of the Seimas (MSNG).''

The term of the Seimas was noted for particularly significant shifts among parliamentary groups. Most notable examples were Social Democratic Party and Order and Justice parliamentary groups. The former had split into two separate parliamentary groups (and later, parties), while the latter (along with the party) completely disintegrated.

By the end of the term of the Seimas, the following parliamentary groups were active.

Members

144 members have served in the Twelfth Seimas.

References

Legal history of Lithuania
21st century in Lithuania
12